DNS Retail (Russian: OOO «ДНС Ритейл», also known in English as CSN Retail LLC) is the owner of a Russian retail chain specialising in the sale of computers, electronics, and household goods, and also a manufacturer of computer hardware including laptops, tablets and smartphones. In 2019, it became the 6th-largest retail company in Russia, and in 2021, DNS was the 22nd-largest private company in Russia. As of 2021, there are more than 2,000 branches across Russia, and in May 2021, the first branches were opened in Kazakhstan. The company's headquarters are located in Vladivostok.

The general director of the company is Aleksei Popov. Popov is also the general director and co-owner of the parent company DNS Group.

History 

DNS (short for Digital Network System) was founded in 1998 in Vladivostok, after the founders' previous business specialising in corporate computer services ended in bankruptcy. The company initially sold computers assembled by hand inside a retail store.

In 2005, the company began to expand its retail presence nationally, opening branches in Nakhodka and Khabarovsk. In 2006, a further branch was opened in Irkutsk. By 2009, there were DNS stores in cities across Russia, including Chita, Novosibirsk, Ekaterinburg and Rostov on Don. At the same time, further branches were opened in regions where the company already had a presence.

By July 2013, the chain consisted of more than 700 stores located in over 200 cities across Russia. In addition, the company owns 10 distribution sites, a computer and laptop manufacturing plant in Artyom, and computer assembly plants in Moscow Oblast and Novosibirsk.

In April 2014, the company acquired the Computer World retail chain (consisting of 21 stores in Saint Petersburg and a further 11 in the Northwestern Federal District). In March 2019, the company further acquired the St. Petersburg-based retail chain .

In May 2021, DNS expanded its retail network beyond Russia for the first time, opening branches in Kazakhstan.

Business activities 

In the first half of 2011, the company assembled 193,000 personal computers, making it the largest PC assembler in Russia. The company also produces laptops, desktop computers, monitors, smartphones, computer power supplies and computer accessories under the brands DNS, DEXP, and ZET Gaming.

Company structure 

The company was founded by 10 acquaintances and residents of Vladivostok, who had experience working in the computer industry. As of 2015, 9 of them continue to work for the company; the remaining founder died and passed his share of the company on to his family.

Prior to 2018, the company consisted of more than 50 legal entities, each of which was registered in a different region but connected to the company by their common owners. In March 2018, however, the company was restructured and all legal entities were merged into the limited liability company DNS Retail (also known as CSN Retail in English).

References

External links
 Official website (Russia)
 Official website (Kazakhstan)

Companies based in Vladivostok
Retail companies of Russia
Russian brands